New Smyrna Speedway is a 1/2-mile asphalt oval racetrack located near New Smyrna Beach, Florida, that races the NASCAR Advance Auto Parts Weekly Series every Saturday night. It also has a smaller track, known as "Little New Smyrna Speedway" in the infield. This track races quarter midgets on Friday nights.

Overview

New Smyrna Speedway hosts the annual World Series of Asphalt Stock Car Racing, featuring nine consecutive nights of racing that runs during Speedweeks every February. The World Series has seen many of the current and former top names in NASCAR competing on the high-banked half-mile including Ryan Newman, Tony Stewart, Kyle Busch, Mark Martin, Geoff Bodine, Rick Wilson, Richie Evans, Jimmy Spencer, and Pete Hamilton, and continually draws the top talent from around the United States and Canada. 

The event features NASCAR tour-type modifieds, "SK" type modifieds, Florida/IMCA-type modifieds, David Rogers super late models, late models, crate engine late models, winged sprint cars, and pro-trucks. Only Geoff Bodine and Ryan Newman have won a championship at the annual event, and gone on in their career to win the Daytona 500. The event incldued the Race to Stop Suicide 200, the ARCA Menards Series East season opener, from 2014 to 2022. The NASCAR Whelen Modified Tour has a race during the event since 2022.

New Smyrna Speedway also hosts the annual Florida Governor's Cup 200 David Rogers super late model race each November. Regarded as the second-most prestigious super late model race in Florida only behind the Snowball Derby, it is among the elite short track racing events in the country, it is a prep event for teams that aspire to participate in the Snowball.

The racing surface was repaved in January 2007.

History

Daytona Raceway

In 1966, Auto Racing Enterprises, Inc., leased and broke ground on what was to become "Daytona Raceway", in Samsula, Florida. The organizations secretary, Benny Corbin, designed the half-mile dirt oval with 13 degree banks and construction was completed by the East Coast Paving Company out of Palatka. After months of delays, leadership of Auto Racing Enterprises, Inc., shifted to Dan Epps and the track held its first event on April 23, 1967. The Sunday afternoon races provided space for 4,000 race fans with an admission price of $2 for adults, $1 for students, and free entry for children. The opening heats and the feature sportsman division event were both won by 27-year-old Budweiser route salesman Jimmy Sapp of Gainesville. Charley Brown of St. Augustine took the win in the late model division. Following the second week of operations, the track shut down for three weeks due to "powder dry" conditions of the track. Despite installing sprinklers systems, using water trucks, and starting races later in the day, dust issues persisted. Facing an unrelenting drought, the dirt oval became asphalt and the first race on the new surface was held on Labor Day of the same year with a 200-lap feature. Racing continued through the end of the season in November.

New Smyrna Speedway

Following disagreements with the members of Auto Racing Enterprises Inc., Benny Corbin and Dan Epps founded Florida Motor Speedways Inc., leased the property, and started the 1968 season with another major change. In an effort to avoid confusion with the nearby Daytona International Speedway (often referred to as the Daytona Raceway), the track changed its name to New Smyrna Speedway.

Afterwards, Corbin partnered with racing promoters Bob Bartel and Ed Otto to launch the World Series of Asphalt Auto Racing at New Smyrna Speedway.

The track's schedule traditionally starts the new NASCAR Advance Auto Parts Weekly Series club racing championship.  Drivers across the country participate in the track's annual Ally Red Eye held on the first weekend of January, where drivers can earn points towards the annual national and Florida state championships.  The Ally Red Eye was traditionally a 100 lap super late model race, but is now split as twin 50-lap features for the late models and David Rogers super late models, as the track renamed the premier class in memory of a local racer and former NASCAR Weekly Series national champion who died of cancer in 2020.

References

External links
 
 Smyrna Speedway race results at Racing-Reference
 New Smyrna Speedway race results at The Third Turn
 FASCAR official site
 New Smyrna Race Track Features Future Stars, Daytona Beach Morning Journal, Aug. 10, 1968.
 Where's Pete Hamilton Now?, Daytona Beach Sunday News-Journal, Feb. 16, 1975.
 Pit Stop, Morning Record and Journal (Meridan, CT), Feb. 11, 1977.
 Allison Back in Spotlight, St. Petersburg Times, Feb. 16, 1977.
 Sunday, It'll be 7 Hours of Country, Daytona Beach Morning Journal, June 23, 1977.
 Racing Thrives at Local Level, The Madison Courier, Feb. 18, 1981.
 New Smyrna Speedway May be Movie Site, Daytona Beach Morning Journal, Oct. 9, 1981.

Motorsport venues in Florida
Sports venues in Volusia County, Florida
Buildings and structures in New Smyrna Beach, Florida
Sports venues completed in 1967
NASCAR tracks
1967 establishments in Florida